Sir Ivo Charles Clayton Rigby (2 June 1911 – 19 April 1987) was a British lawyer and judge. He was Chief Justice of Hong Kong in the early 1970s.

Early life

Rigby was born on 2 June 1911 in Yarmouth, Norfolk. He was the only son of James Philip Clayton Rigby.

He was educated at Magdalen College School, Oxford. He read for the bar at the Inner Temple and was called in 1932.  He practised on the South Eastern Circuit, London and Norwich until 1935.

He married Agnes Bothway of Norwich on the Island of Madeira in 1937.  They divorced in 1948 and he remarried to Kathleen Nancy Jones.

Legal career

In 1935, he was appointed a Police Magistrate in Bathurst, Gambia in 1935.  In 1941, he was appointed a Crown Counsel in Palestine.  Between 1945 and 1948 he served as President of the District Court of Palestine, at Jerusalem, Tel Aviv and Haifa.

He then served as the Assistant Judge in Nyasaland (now Malawi) between 1948 and 1954.

In 1948 he was transferred to Malaya where between 1954 and 1956 he was President of the Sessions Court, Kuala Lumpur.  In 1956, he was appointed Puisne Judge in Malaya, based in Penang.

In 1961, he was appointed Senior Puisne Judge in Hong Kong. He acted as Chief Justice on a number of occasions.  In 1970, he was appointed Chief Justice of Hong Kong replacing Sir Michael Hogan.

He was knighted in 1964.

Military Appointments

Rigby served in the Territorial Army in England between 1931 and 1935.  He also served in the Palestine Volunteer Defence Force, Jerusalem from 1941 until it was disbanded in August 1943.

Other Interests

Rigby was President of the Hong Kong Society for the Prevention of Cruelty to Animals and Chairman of the Hong Kong Squash Association.

He also owned a number of racehorses in Hong Kong including, "Mabrouk" and "Inshallah".

Retirement
Rigby retired to England in 1973. In England, he was appointed a Recorder and a Metropolitan Stipendiary Magistrate.

Death

Rigby died on 19 April 1987 at the age of 75 in Brunei.

References

1911 births
Chief Justices of the Supreme Court of Hong Kong
British Hong Kong judges
Knights Bachelor
Members of the Inner Temple
People educated at Magdalen College School, Oxford
1987 deaths
20th-century British lawyers
Mandatory Palestine judges
Nyasaland judges
Gambia Colony and Protectorate judges
British Malaya judges
Stipendiary magistrates (England and Wales)